Richard Carlton Stovel (March 31, 1921 – June 12, 2012) was a Royal Canadian Air Force and  Canadian Forces Air Command officer. He served as deputy commander of NORAD from 1974 to 1976.

Notes

References

Royal Canadian Air Force officers
Canadian Forces Air Command generals
1921 births
2012 deaths